Horrid Henry is a children's book series by Francesca Simon and illustrated by Tony Ross. It has been adapted for television, film and theatre. Horrid Henry is set in the United Kingdom in 1994.

Books
The first Horrid Henry book was written and published in 1994 by Orion Books. Up until 2015, 24 official Horrid Henry titles were published in the series  with a special one-off 25th Anniversary book, published in 2019. The series has sold more than 21 million copies worldwide.

The books are a slice-of-life series featuring the titular Henry, a wildly misbehaved boy who will typically be faced with a problem and then will often retaliate in interesting ways that involve trickery, rule-breaking and elaborate practical jokes. Henry has a younger brother, Perfect Peter, who is the exact opposite. Almost every character is known by an alliterative nickname (Rude Ralph, Moody Margaret, Brainy Brian, etc.) with a few exceptions (Luanne ("Mum") and Simon ("Dad")).

The Horrid Henry stories are read on audiobook by the actress Miranda Richardson and published by Orion Audio.

Horrid Henry is published in 25 languages around the world. In April 2009, the US Sourcebooks' Jabberwocky imprint released four Horrid Henry paperbacks nationwide, which included Horrid Henry, Horrid Henry's Stinkbomb, Horrid Henry and the Mega-Mean Time Machine" and Horrid Henry Tricks the Tooth Fairy. Sourcebooks has released additional Horrid Henry titles including activity pages, event kits and a teacher's guide. 
The following titles for the Horrid Henry books are titles from the US. Titles next to the following books were published and are known in the UK.

 Horrid Henry (1994) - Series premiere and originally intended to be a single-book 
 Horrid Henry: Secret Club - Published as Horrid Henry and the Secret Club (1995)
 Horrid Henry: Tricking the Tooth Fairy - Previously published as Horrid Henry and the Tooth Fairy and Horrid Henry Tricks the Tooth Fairy (1996)
 Horrid Henry: Nits Nits Nits! - Published as Horrid Henry's Nits (1997)
 Horrid Henry: Get Rich Rick - Published as Horrid Henry Strikes It Rich and Horrid Henry Gets Rich Quick (1998)
 Horrid Henry: The Haunted House -  Published as Horrid Henry and The Haunted House (1999)
 Horrid Henry: The Mummy's Curse - Published as Horrid Henry and The Mummy's Curse (2000)
 Horrid Henry: Perfect Revenge -  Published as Horrid Henry's Revenge (2001)
 Horrid Henry: Bogey Babysitter - Published as Horrid Henry and the Bogey Babysitter (2002)
 Horrid Henry: Stinkbombs - Published as Horrid Henry's Stinkbomb (2002)
 Horrid Henry: Underpants Panic - Published as Horrid Henry's Underpants (2003)
 Horrid Henry: The Queen's Visit - Published as Horrid Henry Meets The Queen (2004)
 Horrid Henry: Mega-Mean Time Machine - Published as Horrid Henry and the Mega-Mean Time Machine (2005)
 Horrid Henry: Football Fiend - Published as Horrid Henry and the Football Fiend (2006)
 Horrid Henry: Christmas Cracker - Published as Horrid Henry's Christmas Cracker (2006)
 Horrid Henry: Abominable Snowman Published as Horrid Henry and the Abominable Snowman (2007)
 Horrid Henry: Bank Robber - Published as Horrid Henry Robs The Bank (2008)
 Horrid Henry: Waking the Dead - Published as Horrid Henry Wakes The Dead (2009)
 Horrid Henry: Rock Star - Published as Horrid Henry Rocks! (2010)
 Horrid Henry: Zombie Vampire - Published as Horrid Henry and the Zombie Vampire (2011)
 Horrid Henry: Monster Movie - Published as Horrid Henry's Monster Movie (2012)
 Horrid Henry: Nightmare - Published as Horrid Henry's Nightmare (2013)
 Horrid Henry: Krazy Ketchup - Published as Horrid Henry's Krazy Ketchup (2014)
 Horrid Henry: Cannibal Curse - Published as Horrid Henry's Cannibal Curse (2015) - Series Finale

Extra Book
Horrid Henry's Bedtime (2005)

Special Edition
 Horrid Henry: Up, Up and Away! (2019) - 25th Anniversary book

Early Readers
 Don't Be Horrid, Henry! (illustrated by Kevin McAleenan in 2000, then Tony Ross in 2006)
 Birthday (previously released from Horrid Henry: Secret Club)
 Holiday (previously released from Horrid Henry)
 Horrid Henry's Underpants (previously released from Horrid Henry: Underpants Panic)
 Horrid Henry Gets Rich Quick (previously released from Horrid Henry: Getting Rich Quick)fggfHorrid Henry's Underpants (previously released from Horrid Henry: Underpants Panic)
 Horrid Henry Gets Rich Quick (previously released from Horrid Henry: Getting Rich Quick)
 Horrid Henry and the Football Fiend (previously released from Horrid Henry: Football Fiend)
 Horrid Henry and the Football Fiend (previously released from Horrid Henry: Football Fiend)
 Horrid Henry's Nits (previously released from Horrid Henry: Nits, Nits, Nits)
 Horrid Henry and Moody Margaret (previously released from Horrid Henry)
 Horrid Henry's Thank You Letter (previously released from Horrid Henry: Underpants Panic)
 Horrid Henry Reads a Book (previously released from Horrid Henry: Stinkbombs)
 Horrid Henry's Car Journey (previously released from Horrid Henry: Bogey Babysitter)
 Moody Margaret's School (previously released from Horrid Henry: Bank Robber)
 Horrid Henry Tricks and Treats (previously released from Horrid Henry: Bogey Babysitter)
 Horrid Henry's Christmas Play (previously released from Horrid Henry: Christmas Cracker)
 Horrid Henry's Rainy Day (previously released from Horrid Henry: Abominable Snowman)
 Horrid Henry Meets the Queen (previously released from Horrid Henry: The Queen's Visit)
 Horrid Henry's Sports Day (previously released from Horrid Henry: Getting Rich Quick)
 Horrid Henry's Christmas Presents (previously released from Horrid Henry: Christmas Cracker)
 Moody Margaret's Makeover (previously released from Horrid Henry: Abominable Snowman)
 Horrid Henry and the Demon Dinner Lady (previously released from Horrid Henry: Perfect Revenge)
 Horrid Henry Tricks the Tooth Fairy (previously released from Horrid Henry: Tricking the Tooth Fairy)
 Horrid Henry's Homework (previously released from Horrid Henry: The Mummy's Curse)
 Horrid Henry and the Bogey Babysitter (previously released from Horrid Henry: Bogey Babysitter)
 Horrid Henry's Sleepover (previously released from Angel Harrison: Stinkbombs)
 Horrid Henry's Wedding (previously released from Horrid Henry: Tricking the Tooth Fairy)
 Horrid Henry's Haunted House (previously released from Horrid Henry: The Haunted House)
 Horrid Henry's Christmas Lunch (previously released from Horrid Henry: Christmas Cracker)
 Horrid Henry's Mother's Day (previously released from Horrid Henry: Nightmare)
 Horrid Henry and the Comfy Black Chair (previously released from Horrid Henry: The Haunted House)
 Horrid Henry and the Mummy's Curse (previously released from Horrid Henry: The Mummy's Curse)
 Horrid Henry and the Abominable Snowman (previously released from Horrid Henry: Abominable Snowman)
 Horrid Henry and the Mega-Mean Time Machine (previously released from Horrid Henry: Mega-Mean Time Machine)
 Horrid Henry and the Fangmangler (previously released from Horrid Henry: Nits, Nits, Nits)
 Horrid Henry's Christmas Ambush (previously released from Horrid Henry: Christmas Cracker)
 Horrid Henry's Swimming Lesson (previously released from Horrid Henry: The Mummy's Curse)
 Horrid Henry's Christmas (previously released from Horrid Henry: Getting Rich Quick)
 Horrid Henry's School Fair (previously released from Horrid Henry: The Haunted House)
 Horrid Henry's Stinkbomb (previously released from Horrid Henry: Stinkbombs)
 Horrid Henry and the Zombie Vampire (previously released from Horrid Henry: Zombie Vampire)
 Horrid Henry's Hike (previously released from Horrid Henry: Mega-Mean Time Machine)
 Horrid Henry's Injection (previously released from Horrid Henry: Secret Club)
 Horrid Henry's Nightmare (previously released from Horrid Henry: Nightmare)
 Horrid Henry's Newspaper (previously released from Horrid Henry: Rocking the World)

Television adaptation

Film adaptation 

On 23 June 2010, Vertigo Films announced that a live action 3-D film of Horrid Henry was in production. The film's plot focuses on Henry and The Purple Hand Gang fighting to prevent the closure of their school by an evil private school Headmaster. The film was released on 29 July 2011 in the United Kingdom and 11 January 2013 in Australia.

Reception 
 In April 2008 "Horrid Henry and the Abominable Snowman" won the Galaxy Children's book of the Year Award.
 Horrid Henry has twice been nominated for BAFTA's Best Animation; in 2009 and 2010.
 On 23 November 2018, the show's official Twitter account posted a GIF of Henry "flossing”  which went viral.

See also

 Horrid Henry (TV series)
 Horrible Harry, a different character

Notes

References 
 Robert McCrum interview in the Guardian
 Q&A with Francesca Simon
 Telegraph interview with Francesca Simon
 The Stage review.Horrid Henry Live and Horrid

External links
 Official Francesca Simon Web Site
 The official Horrid Henry books Web Site
 Horrid Henry publishers site - Orion Books
 The official Horrid Henry TV / DVD Web Site horridhenry.me
 Novel Entertainment's web site
 CITV official Page
 Steam announcement page of Horrid Henry Game

 
Book series introduced in 1994
Child characters in literature
Horrid Henry characters
Series of children's books
Literary characters introduced in 1994
Characters in British novels of the 20th century
Characters in British novels of the 21st century
Sourcebooks books